A total solar eclipse will occur on Saturday, July 22, 2028. The central line of the path of the eclipse will cross the Australian continent from the Kimberley region in the north west and continue in a south-easterly direction through Western Australia, the Northern Territory, south-west Queensland and New South Wales, close to the towns of Wyndham, Kununurra, Tennant Creek, Birdsville, Bourke and Dubbo, and continuing on through the centre of Sydney, where the eclipse will have a duration of over three minutes. It will also cross Queenstown and Dunedin, New Zealand. Totality will also be viewable from two of Australia's external territories: Christmas Island and Cocos (Keeling) Island.

Related eclipses

Eclipses in 2028
 A partial lunar eclipse on Wednesday, 12 January 2028.
 An annular solar eclipse on Wednesday, 26 January 2028.
 A partial lunar eclipse on Thursday, 6 July 2028.
 A total solar eclipse on Saturday, 22 July 2028.
 A total lunar eclipse on Sunday, 31 December 2028.

Solar eclipses of 2026–2029

Saros 146 

It is a part of Saros cycle 146, repeating every 18 years, 11 days, containing 76 events. The series started with partial solar eclipse on September 19, 1541. It contains total eclipses from May 29, 1938 through October 7, 2154, hybrid eclipses from October 17, 2172 through November 20, 2226, and annular eclipses from December 1, 2244 through August 10, 2659. The series ends at member 76 as a partial eclipse on December 29, 2893. The longest duration of totality was 5 minutes, 21 seconds on June 30, 1992.

<noinclude>

Metonic cycle

External links 

2028 in science
2028 07 22
2028 07 22
2028 07 22